Bopha Pos Vek is a Cambodian film. It is a sequel to the film Entry Komar. The film stars Tep Rindaro as Reahu, Pisith Pilika as Chetra Tevy, Yutthara Chanee as Entry Komar, Sok Sreymom as Angelikesor, and Buncheurn Soriyan as Chendamony. The film was distributed in VHS by Preah Vihear Production and on DVD by Klang Moueng Video.

References 

Cambodian drama films